The 1927-28 season in Swedish football, starting August 1927 and ending July 1928:

Honours

Official titles

Competitions

Promotions, relegations and qualifications

Promotions

League transfers

Relegations

Domestic results

Allsvenskan 1927–28

Allsvenskan promotion play-off 1927–28

Division 2 Uppsvenska Serien 1927–28

Division 2 Mellansvenska Serien 1927–28

Division 2 Östsvenska Serien 1927–28

Division 2 Västsvenska Serien 1927–28

Division 2 Sydsvenska Serien 1927–28

Norrländska Mästerskapet 1928 
Final

National team results 

 Sweden: 

 Sweden: 

 Sweden: 

 Sweden: 

 Sweden: 

 Sweden: 

 Sweden: 

 Sweden:

National team players in season 1927/28

Notes

References 
Print

Online

 
Seasons in Swedish football